Cirillo Manicardi (9 December 1856 – 27 May 1925) was an Italian painter of oils and watercolors, mainly of genre interiors.

Manicardi was born in Massenzatico, today part of Reggio. In 1884 at Turin, he exhibited Così va il mondo!... In 1887 at the Exhibition of Venice, he displayed Church choir.

References

1856 births
1925 deaths
People from Reggio Emilia
19th-century Italian painters
Italian male painters
20th-century Italian painters
19th-century Italian male artists
20th-century Italian male artists